Frederick James Robinson (born 29 December 1954) is an English former professional footballer, who played in defence for Rotherham United, Doncaster Rovers and Huddersfield Town.

References

Bibliography

1954 births
Living people
English footballers
Footballers from Rotherham
Association football defenders
English Football League players
Rotherham United F.C. players
Doncaster Rovers F.C. players
Huddersfield Town A.F.C. players